The Hague Court can refer to:
 International Court of Justice
 International Criminal Court